HD 138867, also known as HR 5786, is a bluish-white hued star located in the southern circumpolar constellation Apus. It has an apparent magnitude of 5.94, making it faintly visible to the naked eye if viewed under ideal conditions. Based on parallax measurements from the Gaia spacecraft, it is estimated to be 417 light years away from Earth.

HD 138867 has a stellar classification of B9.5 V, indicating that it is a B-type main-sequence star just shy of being an A-type star. It it has 2.81 times the mass of the Sun and is estimated to be 272 million years, having completed 67.4% of its main sequence lifetime. A solar metallicity has been calculated for HD 138867.

There has been disagreement in regards to HD 138867's muplicity. Chini et al. (2012) list it as a solitary star while Eggleton and Tokovinn (2008) found it to be an astrometric binary. The first one is more likely as the object has a constant radial velocity.

References

Apus (constellation)
B-type main-sequence stars
076877
5786
138867
PD-75 01222
Apodis, 34